The Jaitsar Central State Farm was established by the Indian government in 1964 on 12150 hectares of land in Jaitsar, Sri Ganganagar. The Soviet Union provided agriculture machinery and trained Indian farm operators.

The primary crops of the farm are wheat, gram, mustard, rapeseed, moong, bajra and jowar.

The Indian cabinet also approved a 200 mW solar plant on 400 hectares of CSF Jaitsar land.

References

Sri Ganganagar
Agriculture in Rajasthan
Solar power in India
Soviet foreign aid
India–Soviet Union relations
1964 establishments in Rajasthan